Music Machine II (AKA The Music Machine: All About Love) (1983) is a Christian children's album by Candle that is a continuation of the Music Machine album from 1977.  It is set in Agapeland, and teaches children about the Love. It features the characters Stevie and Nancy.  It is part of a series of spin-offs of Music Machine albums, books, and Music Machine movies.   This album is the winner of the 1983 Dove Award for "Children's Music Album of the Year," and it was Nominated for the 1983 Grammy Award "Best Recording for Children."

Track listing 
"When Love Lives in Your Heart" (J. Miller) - soloist Betsy Hernandez
"Tune Up Song" (J. Miller, B. Miller) - soloists Julie Miller and Buddy Miller
"The Greatest Thing of All" (J. Miller) - soloist Nathan Carlson
"Love Never Fails" (J. Miller, R. Krueger) - soloist Buddy Miller
"Glad to be Me" (J. Miller, B. Miller) - soloist Ben Roberts
"I Was Made for Love" (J. Miller, B. Miller) - soloists Buddy Miller, Julie Miller, Heather Stevens, and Ben Roberts
"Sloop Song" (B. Hernandez, B. Miller) - soloists Wayne Zeitner, Heather Stevens, and John Swartzbaugh
"Bee Humble" (S. Simonson) - soloist Jeremy Stevens
"I Love You" (R. Krueger) - soloist Heather Stevens
"Love Waits A Long, Long Time" (F. Hernandez) - soloist Frank Hernandez as Herbert the Snail and Herbert's mom
"Everybody Needs a Lot of Love" (R. Krueger) - soloist Buddy Miller
"I Love You, Lord Jesus" (J. Miller)
"The Greatest Thing of All (Reprise)"  (J. Miller)
"When Love Lives in Your Heart (Reprise)" (J. Miller)

Credits
Story by - Agape Force
Executive Producer - Tony Salerno
Producers - Tony Salerno, Fletch Wiley, and Ron Krueger
Arrangers - Fletch Wiley, Buddy Miller
Recording Engineers - Wally Duguid, Brian Tankersley, and Bob Singelton
Recorded at - Rivendell Sound Recorders in Pasadena, Texas, Robin Hood Studio in Tyler, Texas, Easter Song Studio in Garden Valley, Texas, and Omega Audio in Dallas
Mastered at - Future Disc Systems in Hollywood by Steve Hall
Mixing Engineer - Ron Capone
Mixed at - Westwind in Westlake Village, California
Cover and inside art - Mark Pendergrass

Characters
Mr. Conductor - Wayne Zeitner
Stevie - John Swartzbaugh
Nancy - Heather Stevens
Sloops - "Various Sloops"

Musicians
Vocalists - Candle
Children's Choral - Agapeland Singers
Piano - Allen Mesko
Drums - Pat Bautz
Bass - Dan Smith
Guitar - Buddy Miller
Synthesizers - Allen Mesko and Si Simonson
Trombonist - Doug Hinschberger
Percussion - Gene Clover
Concertmaster - Anshel Brusilow

References

Sources
1983 Dove Award winners
1983 Grammy Award nominees

1983 albums
Agapeland albums